Gary Primich (April 20, 1958 – September 23, 2007) was an American blues harmonica player, singer, guitarist and songwriter. He is best known for his 1995 album, Mr. Freeze.

Biography
Gary Alan Primich was born in Chicago, Illinois, but grew up in nearby Hobart, Indiana, where he attended Hobart High School.  In 1984, after he graduated with a Bachelor's degree from Indiana University, Primich relocated to Austin, Texas.

While working at the University of Texas, he started playing along with other musicians in local clubs. In 1987, he met Jimmy Carl Black, and they formed the Mannish Boys. Their debut album, A L'il Dab'll Do Ya was issued on the Amazing Records label, and although Black then left the band, Primich stayed with the Mannish Boys for another album, Satellite Rock. In 1991 Primich released his eponymous solo debut album, and My Pleasure followed the next year. Amazing Records then folded, and Primich was contracted to the Flying Fish Records label releasing Travelin' Mood (1994) and Mr. Freeze (1995). Mr. Freeze was named as one of the twenty best blues albums of the 1990s by the Chicago newspaper, New City.

Constant touring allowed Primich to expand his fan base, and by 2000, he had a recording contract with the Texas Music Group. He issued Dog House Music (2002) and then Ridin' the Darkhorse (2006). Primich also recorded with Steve James, Omar & the Howlers, John "Juke" Logan, Marcia Ball, Ruthie Foster, Mike Morgan and the Crawl, Nick Curran, Doyle Bramhall and Jimmie Vaughan.

In addition to his performance albums, in 1985 Primich released an instructional double CD, Blues Harmonica: The Blues And Beyond.  In June 1999, at the Montgomery Theater in San Jose, California, Primich undertook a performance and series of workshops with Howard Levy, Magic Dick, Gary Smith, Lee Oskar, Jerry Portnoy, and Andy Santana. He was inducted in the Austin Music Hall of Fame.

In September 2007, Primich died at his home in Austin, at the age of 49, of acute heroin intoxication.

Discography
Gary Primich (1991) - Amazing
My Pleasure (1992) - Amazing
Hot Harp Blues (1993) - Amazing
Travelin' Mood (1994) - Flying Fish
Mr. Freeze (1995) - Flying Fish
Company Man (1997) - Black Top
Botheration (1999) -  Black Top
Dog House Music (2002) - Antone's
Ridin' the Darkhorse (2006) - Electro-Fi
Just a Little Bit More ... with Omar Dykes (2012) - Old Pal Records

See also
List of electric blues musicians
List of harmonicists

References

External links
[ Biography] at Allmusic
Photographs and videos at NME.com

1958 births
2007 deaths
American blues guitarists
American male guitarists
American blues singers
Songwriters from Illinois
American blues harmonica players
Harmonica blues musicians
Electric blues musicians
Singers from Chicago
Deaths by heroin overdose in the United States
People from Hobart, Indiana
20th-century American singers
Songwriters from Indiana
Guitarists from Chicago
Guitarists from Indiana
20th-century American guitarists
20th-century American male singers
Flying Fish Records artists
Black Top Records artists
American male songwriters